The governor-general of Norway ( or , both meaning 'lieutenant of the realm' (see stadtholder)), was the appointed head of the Norwegian Government in the absence of the monarch, during the union with Denmark and Sweden.

Etymology 
() means "steward". Its component parts literally translate as "place holder," or as a direct cognate, "stead holder", it was a term for a "steward" or "lieutenant".

Governors-general appointed by the kings of Norway and Denmark
The office of Governor-general of Norway was established in 1556 and was occupied with occasional interruptions until 1814.
The Governor-general was normally at the same time Lensherre (Governor) of Akershus len (after 1662; Akershus amt), and was the highest authority in the country.
The successive Stattholder of Norway during its union with Denmark were:

|-style="text-align:center;"
!colspan=7|Office vacant(1739–1750)

|-style="text-align:center;"
!colspan=7|Office vacant(8 February 1771 – 25 July 1809)

Governors-general appointed by the kings of Norway and Sweden
The following describes the office of governor as it was from 1814 during the union with Sweden:

The office came into existence by the Norwegian Constitution, of 4 November 1814 where the paragraphs 12, 13 and 15 stipulated that a governor-general of Swedish or Norwegian nationality could be appointed. The governor-general resided in Christiania (today Oslo) and led the Government in the absence of the monarch, when he resided in his Swedish capital Stockholm. The Council was normally led by the governor-general, who had two votes, unless the Monarch was present, at which point he would lose his authority and merely become the first among equals, or prime minister of the council.

The post was held by Swedish appointees from 1814 until 1829, when it was vacated by natural causes. Protests left the position empty until 1836, when it was filled by a Norwegian appointee. He was succeeded in 1841 but the successor Severin Løvenskiold laid down his office in 1856, after which it would not be reinstated. The demand to abandon the office completely was ultimately granted in 1873 by King Oscar II.

List of governors-general (Stattholdere) during the Union between Sweden and Norway
1814–1816: Count Hans Henric von Essen
1816–1818: Count Carl Carlsson Mörner
1818–1827: Count Johan August Sandels
1827–1829: Count Baltzar von Platen

From 1829 to 1836, the office was vacant.

1836–1840: Count Johan Caspar Herman Wedel-Jarlsberg

From 1840 to 1841, the office was vacant.

1841–1856: Severin Løvenskiold

From 1856 to 1873, the office was vacant, then it was abolished.

See also
List of Norwegian monarchs
List of Norwegian Prime Ministers
Union between Sweden and Norway

Sources and references
 WorldStatesmen – Norway
 Statholderembetet 1572–1771

References

External links

Norwegian monarchy
 
Denmark–Norway
United Kingdoms of Sweden and Norway
Gubernatorial titles
Political history of Norway
1556 establishments in Europe
16th-century establishments in Norway